The Elbow (or Elbow Reef) is a coral reef located within the Florida Keys National Marine Sanctuary. It lies to the east of Key Largo, within the Key Largo Existing Management Area, which is immediately to the east of John Pennekamp Coral Reef State Park. This reef is within a Sanctuary Preservation Area (SPA).  The Elbow is southwest of Carysfort and east of Dry Rocks reefs.

References
 NOAA National Marine Sanctuary Maps, Florida Keys East
 NOAA website on Elbow Reef

External links
 Benthic Habitat Map

Coral reefs of the Florida Keys